Isabel Scott Rorick (1900–1967) was an American writer known for her comedic book Mr. and Mrs. Cugat, which was one of the top ten best selling books in the United States in 1941.

Rorick was born in Toledo, Ohio in 1900.  Her involvement in the local Junior League newsletter in the mid-1930s eventually led to her contributing fictional sketches to the national Junior League publication.  Her stories about the married Cugat couple, a young bank executive and his wife, led to interest by Houghton Mifflin, and ten sketches complete with illustrations were published in October 1940 as Mr. and Mrs. Cugat, the Record of a Happy Marriage.  It became one of the best selling books of 1941.  It was also made into a movie in 1942, Are Husbands Necessary? starring Ray Milland and Betty Field as the Cugats.

Rorick published a follow-up collection of Cugat stories, Outside Eden, in November 1945.  In 1948, the radio show My Favorite Husband based on the Cugat stories debuted on CBS Radio.  Lucille Ball and Richard Denning played the Cugats, though their last name was soon changed to Cooper to avoid confusion with bandleader Xavier Cugat.  When CBS asked Ball to do a television version of the show, she insisted that her husband Desi Arnaz play her husband on the show.  Since Arnaz could not pull off the role of a midwestern banker, the show was reworked into what became I Love Lucy.

Rorick's husband, Ceilan H. Rorick, a banker in the Spitzer-Rorick Trust and Savings Bank of Toledo, died in June 1958.  Rorick died in 1967.  They are buried in Woodlawn Cemetery in Toledo.  The couple had two children, Horton and Elizabeth (Mimi).

References

External links
 
 Finding Aid - Isabel Scott Rorick, Mr. and Mrs. Cugat Typescripts, University of Toledo library

1900 births
1967 deaths
American comedy writers
American women short story writers
Writers from Toledo, Ohio
20th-century American women writers
20th-century American short story writers